The Künes River is a tributary of the river Ili in Xinjiang Uyghur Autonomous Region, that originates in the eastern Tianshan.

Geography
The Künes River originates in the eastern Tianshan in the Eren Habirga Mountains and flows from east to west to merge with the Tekes River and form the Ili. It flows through glacial, alpine, and grassland environments, the latter including semi-arid, dry-steppe, steppe, meadow grassland, and mountain meadow.

Tributaries
Main tributaries of the Künes River include:

Arshan (right)
Merke (aka Borgustaya) (right)
Ken-su (aka Naryn gol, Kharkhan) (right)
Bokchurgan gol (right)
Turgen (right)
Tsanma (Tsauman gol) (left)

Settlements
Major settlements located on the Künes River include:
Kunes County seat

References

Rivers of China
Rivers of Xinjiang
Ili Kazakh Autonomous Prefecture